The Al Fahidi Fort, is a horse race run over a distance of 1,400 metres (seven furlongs) on turf in January at Meydan Racecourse in Dubai. The race is named after the oldest existing building in Dubai.

It was first run in 2003 Nad Al Sheba Racecourse before being transferred to Meydan in 2010.

The race distance was 1600 metres until 2014 it was reduced to 1400 metres.

The race began as a Listed race in 2003. The race was elevated to Group 3 level in 2004 and became a Group 2 event in 2006.

Records
Record time:
1:21.59 - Al Suhail (2023) (1400 metres)
1:35.97 - D'Anjou (2004) (1600 metres)

Most successful horse (2 wins):
 Linngari – 2006, 2007
 Safety Check – 2015, 2016

Most wins by a jockey:
 5 - Kevin Shea 2003, 2006, 2007, 2008, 2012

Most wins by a trainer:
 7 - 	Charlie Appleby 2015, 2016, 2018, 2019, 2020, 2022, 2023

Most wins by an owner:
 7 - Godolphin Racing 2015, 2016, 2018, 2019, 2021, 2022, 2023

Winners

See also
 List of United Arab Emirates horse races

References

Racing Post:

Horse races in the United Arab Emirates
Recurring events established in 2003
Nad Al Sheba Racecourse
2003 establishments in the United Arab Emirates